Aphelochaeta is a genus of bitentaculate cirratulidan, or two-tentacled marine worms.

Species 
 A. antelonga Dean & Blake, 2016
 A. arizonae Magalhaes & Bailey-Brock, 2013
 A. caribbeanensis Blake & Dean, 2019
 A. guimondi Dean & Blake, 2016
 A. honouliuli Magalhaes & Bailey-Brock, 2013
 A. praeacuta Dean & Blake, 2016
 A. saipanensis Magalhaes & Bailey-Brock, 2013
 A. striata Dean & Blake, 2016
 A. zebra Dean & Blake, 2016

References

External links
WORMS

Terebellida